Amblyomma triguttatum, commonly known as the kangaroo tick, is a species of tick in the genus Amblyomma native to Australia.  There are four subspecies, one or more of which might be separate species. The nominate subspecies is a vector for Rickettsia.

Like all species in its family, Ixodidae (known as hard ticks), the kangaroo tick is a parasitic arachnid and is an obligate hematophage, solely consuming blood for its nutritional needs. It is found in Western Australia, parts of Queensland, and in New South Wales. Thought to be a carrier of Q fever, in addition to parasitising macropods such as western grey kangaroos and Tammar wallabies, it has been found on a variety of other mammalian hosts, including black rats, European rabbit, domesticated dogs and cats, and humans.

References

Amblyomma
Animals described in 1844
Arachnids of Australia